Hazarduari Palace, earlier known as the Bara Kothi, is located in the campus of Kila Nizamat in Murshidabad, in the Indian state of West Bengal. It is situated near the bank of river Ganges. It was built in the nineteenth century by architect Duncan Macleod, under the reign of Nawab Nazim Humayun Jah of Bengal, Bihar and Orissa (1824–1838).

In 1985, the palace was handed over to the Archaeological Survey of India for better preservation.

According to the Archaeological Survey of India as mentioned in the List of Monuments of National Importance in West Bengal, the Hazarduari Palace and Imambara ASI Listed Monuoments.

Kila Nizamat

Kila Nizamat or Nizamat Kila (Nizamat Fort) was the site of the old fort of Murshidabad. It was located on the present site of the Hazarduari Palace, on the banks of the Bhagirathi river.

Etymology
The name of the palace that is Hazarduari means "a palace with a thousand doors". Hazar  means "thousand" and Duari means "the one with doors"; thus, the total sums up to "the one with a thousand doors".

The palace earlier known as Bara Kothi has been named so as the palace has in all 1000 doors, of which 100 are false. They were built so that if any thief or robber tried to steal something and escape, he would be confused between the false and real doors and by that time he would be caught by the Nawab's guards.

Museum

The palace has now been transformed into a museum which houses collections from the Nawabs like priceless paintings, furniture, antiques and so on. The famous one is the mirror and the chandelier. In 1985, the palace was handed over to the Archaeological Survey of India for better preservation.

Miniature
A miniature of the palace, made by Sagore Mistri in ivory, along with portraits of His Highness and his son, among other presents, were sent to King William IV. He honoured the Nawab with a full-size portrait of His Majesty and an autographed letter, and conferred upon him the badge and insignia of the Royal Guelphic and Hanoverian order, which are still preserved in the Palace.

Map

See also
 Chawk Masjid
 Murshidabad
 Nizamat Imambara
 Nawabs of Bengal and Murshidabad
 History of Bengal
 History of Bangladesh
 History of India

References

External links

 

Palaces in West Bengal
Tourist attractions in Murshidabad
Buildings and structures in Murshidabad district
Monuments of National Importance in West Bengal